is a product designer who is actively based in Tokyo.She handles designs for a wide range of products, from electronics to household items, medical equipment, and even total direction duties for hotels. She is recognized for her gentle and elaborately detailed expressions of form, and she has received very high acclaim primarily throughout Asia. She is one of the most influential female designers in Japan, and she served as Chair of the Judging Committee for the Good Design Award from 2018 to 2020.
She is a Japan Design Committee member.

Select awards 
2006 – AVON Awards to Women Art Awards
2007 – iF Gold Award
2008 – iF Award
2008 – Red Dot product design award
2010 – Good Design Gold award
2010 – Design for Asia Awards
2011 – Good Design Gold award
2011 – Red Dot product design award
2011 – iF Award
2012 – Mainichi Design Prize
2013 – iF Award
2014 – Good Design Long life design award
2014 – The Design Award of the Federal Republic of Germany
2015 – Good Design Long life design award
2016 – The Design Award of the Federal Republic of Germany
2017 – Good Design Gold award with 2items
2020 – Good Design award Best100
2021 – ELLE DECO INTERNATIONAL DESIGN AWARDS

Select works 

 9h(ninehours)
 muji
 body sofa
 Oral care series
 Omron
 Thermometer[Omron Electronic Thermometer MC-670/681]
 KINTO
Table ware series
 ITOKI
 Working chair vertebra03
 HOLMEGAARD
CADO vase
 BROKIS
Glass Lighting AWA
Glass Lighting BONBORI
 franky, Inc.
Suitcase moln

Book
'Forms within Forms' (2012), Art Design Publishing

References

External links
Design Studio S

Living people
Year of birth missing (living people)
Japanese industrial designers
Product designers
Artists from Tokyo
Design writers
Musashino Art University alumni
Academic staff of Musashino Art University